Pari Kola (also Romanized as Parī Kolā) is a village in Lalehabad Rural District, Lalehabad District, Babol County, Mazandaran Province, Iran. At the 2006 census, its population was 79, in 24 families.

References 

Populated places in Babol County